Pastrengo is a comune (municipality) in the Province of Verona in the Italian region Veneto, located about  west of Venice and about  northwest of Verona.

The municipality of Pastrengo contains the frazione (subdivision) Piovezzano.

Pastrengo borders the following municipalities: Bardolino, Bussolengo, Cavaion Veronese, Lazise, Pescantina, and Sant'Ambrogio di Valpolicella.

Pastrengo is known for the Battle of Pastrengo which was fought between the Piedmontese and Austrian armies on 30 April 1848, in the course of the First Italian War of Independence.

The local parish church is the Parrocchia Esaltazione della Santa Croce.

Demographic evolution

References

Cities and towns in Veneto